Gap Fire may refer to:
 Summit Tunnel Fire - A 1984 train fire in  the Summit Tunnel on the Greater Manchester/West Yorkshire border.
 Summit Fire (2008) - A 2008 wildfire in the Santa Cruz Mountains
 Summit Fire (2013) - A 2013 wildfire in Riverside County